Jangareddygudem revenue division (or Jangareddygudem division) is an administrative division in the Eluru district of the Indian state of Andhra Pradesh. It is one of the 3 revenue divisions in the district which consists of 10 mandals under its administration. Jangareddygudem is the divisional headquarters.

Administration 
Kukunoor and Velerupadu were transferred to West Godavari district from Khammam district of Telangana. The 10 mandals administered under Jangareddygudem revenue division are:

See also 
List of revenue divisions in Andhra Pradesh
List of mandals in Andhra Pradesh

References 

Revenue divisions in Eluru district